Esmaili may refer to:

Places
 Esmaili, Iran, a village in Kerman Province
 Esmaili-ye Olya (disambiguation)
 Esmaili-ye Olya, Ilam
 Esmaili Olya, Kerman
 Esmaili-ye Sofla (disambiguation)
 Esmaili-ye Sofla, Ilam
 Esmaili Sofla, Kerman
 Esmaili District, in Kerman Province
 Esmaili Rural District, in Kerman Province

People

Esmaeili
Ali Esmaeili (born 1996), Iranian footballer 
Fariborz Esmaeili (1940–2020), Iranian footballer
Farshid Esmaeili (born 1994), Iranian footballer
Lazım Esmaeili (also "Lazem") (1945–1995), Kurdish Iranian spy operating in Turkey
Mohammad Esmaeili (born 1960), Iranian conservative politician
Mohsen Esmaeili (born 1964), Iranian consulting jurist and member of both the Guardian Council and Assembly of Experts
Tareq Esmaeili (born 1977), Qatari cyclist

Esmaili
Farzad Esmaili, Iranian military officer, a commander of the Iranian Air Defense Force
Habiballah Esmaili, Iranian historian

See also
Ismaili (disambiguation), variant of Arabic-based Ismaili / Ismaily
Ismaili (surname), variant of Arabic-based Ismaili / Smaily

Iranian-language surnames